Unplugged Live Sava Centar is a box set from Serbian and Yugoslav hard rock band Kerber, released in 2018. Unplugged Live Sava Centar features video and audio version of the unplugged concert the band held on 12 December 2017 in Belgrade's Sava Centar.

Unplugged Live Sava Centar is the band's first release recorded with guitarist Nebojša Minić. It is the band's first release to feature the songs "Ne govori" ("Don't Speak") and "Pepeo i prah" ("Ashes and Dust"), which have not appeared on any of the band's studio releases.

DVD

Disc 1

Disc 2

CD

Personnel
Goran Šepa - vocals
Tomislav Nikolić - guitar
Nebojša Minić - guitar
Branislav Božinović - keyboard
Zoran Madić - bass guitar
Josip Hartl - drums

References

Kerber compilation albums
Kerber live albums
2018 compilation albums
2018 live albums
PGP-RTS compilation albums
PGP-RTS live albums